The 1998 Philippine Basketball Association (PBA) Governors' Cup was the fourth conference of the 1998 PBA season. It started on October 9 and ended on December 9, 1998. The tournament is a two-import format, which requires each team to have two American reinforcements.

Format
The following format will be observed for the duration of the conference:
 One-round robin eliminations; Teams' won-loss record in the Centennial Cup were carried over
 The top four teams after the eliminations will advance to the semifinals. 
 Semifinals will be two round robin affairs with the standings back to zero.
 The top two teams will face each other in a best-of-seven championship series. The next two teams dispute the third-place trophy in a Best of three series.

Elimination round

Team standings

Semifinals

Team standings

Results

First seed playoff

Second seed playoff

Third place playoffs

Finals

References

External links
 PBA.ph

Governors' Cup
PBA Governors' Cup